A water maze is a device used to test an animal's memory in which the alleys are filled with water, providing a motivation to escape.

Many different mazes exist, such as T- and Y-mazes, Cincinnati water mazes, and radial arm mazes. Water mazes have been used to test discrimination learning and spatial learning abilities. The Morris water navigation task is often called a "water maze task", but this is erroneous as it is not, properly speaking, a maze. The development of these mazes has aided research into, for example, hippocampal synaptic plasticity, NMDA receptor function, and looking into neurodegenerative diseases, such as Alzheimer's disease.

References 

Behavioral neuroscience